Apamea sora is a moth of the family Noctuidae. It is found in western North America, where it is distributed across the Pacific Northwest to the Alaska Panhandle and east to the Rocky Mountains of  Alberta.

This moth has a forewing length of 17 to 21 millimeters. It is variable, appearing in shades of orange, ochre, gray to gray-violet, and black. The male has bead-like antennae.

The moth inhabits the high-elevation spruce and fir forests and mid-elevation ponderosa pine forests of the mountain ranges of western North America.

The adult is nocturnal. The larva is unknown, but it is probably a cutworm.

This was formerly considered to be a subspecies of Apamea auranticolor.

References

External links
Images

Apamea (moth)
Moths of North America
Moths described in 1903